Rasmus Kjær Pedersen (born 4 October 1998) is a Danish badminton player.

Achievements

BWF International Challenge/Series (6 titles, 5 runners-up) 
Men's doubles

  BWF International Challenge tournament
  BWF International Series tournament
  BWF Future Series tournament

References

External links 
 

1998 births
Living people
People from Glostrup Municipality
Danish male badminton players
Sportspeople from the Capital Region of Denmark